Cosmin Valentin Stoian (born 8 January 1995) is a Romanian professional footballer who plays as a midfielder or forward for Unirea Braniștea.

Honours
Oțelul Galați
Liga III: 2020–21

References

External links
 
 

1995 births
Living people
People from Galați
Romanian footballers
Association football midfielders
Liga I players
Liga II players
Liga III players
ASC Oțelul Galați players
FC Delta Dobrogea Tulcea players